Unborn But Forgotten (lit. "White Room") is a 2002 South Korean film directed by Im Chang-jae. Due to its plot, the film has been compared to both The Ring and FeardotCom.

Plot 
TV producer Han Su-jin investigates a string of mysterious deaths involving pregnant women after they have visited a website. Out of curiosity Han visits the website; later she starts to have bizarre hallucinations, suggesting that her death may be imminent. Han hires a detective named Choi to help her solve the mystery.

Cast 
 Lee Eun-ju as Han Su-jin
 Jung Joon-ho as Lee Seok
 Kye Seong-yong
 Myeong Ji-yeon
 Kim Ki-hyeon
 Jo Seon-mook
 Kim Jae-rok
 Lee Kan-hee as Hospital director
 Kim Kyeong-ik

Music 
The song "Awen" written and performed by Irish duo RUA (Liz Madden and Gloria Mulhall) was used as the theme song for the main character. This song was taken from their first album RUA released by Celtic Collections.

References

External links 
 
 
 

2002 films
2002 horror films
2000s Korean-language films
South Korean mystery films
South Korean thriller films
2000s South Korean films